The Andriamamovoka Falls is a waterfall in central Madagascar.

It is situated on the Namorona River in the Vatovavy region, near Ranomafana National Park.

References

External links
 andycarpenter.me.uk: Picture Gallery of Andriamovoka Falls
Waterfalls of Madagascar